The Way I Feel Today is the third album by English indie rock band Six by Seven. It was released in 2002 on Beggars Banquet Records in the UK and Mantra Recordings in the US. The band's first album as a four-piece following the departure of guitarist Sam Hempton, it showcased what was in part more song-based, commercial approach following the building, atmospheric drone rock of previous albums The Things We Make and The Closer You Get. It includes the single "I.O.U. Love", possibly the band's most pop-orientated to date.

Track listing

Personnel
Chris Olley – vocals, guitar
Paul Douglas – bass
Chris Davis – drums
James Flower – keyboards

Additional personnel
Ray Dickaty – flute on "I.O.U. Love", saxophones on "Requiem for an Oil-Spill Seagull"
Sharon MckKinley – cello on "All My New Best Friends"
Oliver Wilson-Dickson – violin on "All My New Best Friends"
John Hoare – trumpets and horns on "All My New Best Friends"

References

Six by Seven albums
2002 albums
Albums recorded at Rockfield Studios